The Badminton Asian Cup was an Asian continental championship in the five individual disciplines in badminton. It was held in 1991, 1994, 1995 and 1996. From 1997 a team competition called the Asia Cup followed. The Asian Cup Individual championship featured the best players in Asia with the aim of further strengthening and consolidating Asian development in the world badminton. This prestigious invitation event witnessed the best players in Asia to compete for the prize money of US$100,000, one of the richest purses in Asian badminton event.

Venues

Winners

Performances by nation

References 

http://www.worldbadminton.com/results/9606_ciba.html

Badminton tournaments in Asia